Gol-e Zard-e Abdi (also Romanized as Gol-e Zard-e ‘Abdī and Golzard-e ‘Abdī; also known as Gol-e Zard and Qol-e Zard) is a village in Malmir Rural District, Sarband District, Shazand County, Markazi Province, Iran. At the 2006 census, its population was 427, in 117 families.

References 

Populated places in Shazand County